Nick LaBrocca (born December 4, 1984) is a former American soccer player.

Career

Youth and college
LaBrocca played high school soccer at Christian Brothers Academy in Lincroft, New Jersey before going on to having a three time All-Big East career at Rutgers University.

Professional
After impressing the scouts at the 2007 MLS Combine, LaBrocca was selected 35th overall by Colorado Rapids in the 2007 MLS SuperDraft. LaBrocca was a regular starter for the reserve team that won the 2007 MLS Reserve Division championship, and became a regular starter in the senior team during the 2008 MLS season.

In March 2010, LaBrocca was traded with a third-round pick in the 2011 MLS SuperDraft pick to Toronto FC in exchange for Marvell Wynne. He made his debut for Toronto FC on March 27, 2010 against Columbus Crew. LaBrocca scored his first goal for the club in a 4–1 home victory over Chicago on May 8.

In March 2011, LaBrocca was traded to Chivas USA in exchange for Alan Gordon. The move to Chivas USA would end up serving as the catalyst for LaBrocca's career year. On July 9,  LaBrocca scored the 10,000th goal in MLS history in a 1–1 draw with Sporting Kansas City.  Then, on July 19, LaBrocca was selected for the 2011 MLS All-Star Game against Manchester United. He played the second half as Manchester United won 4–0.

In January 2013, LaBrocca made his return to Colorado after he was traded from Chivas USA to the Rapids in exchange for Eric Avila.

LaBrocca signed with Chicago Fire in January 2016.

International
LaBrocca has played for the US national U-20 and U-23 national teams. On November 11, 2008 LaBrocca received his first call up to the senior national team camp ahead of a World Cup Qualifier against Guatemala, but did not play in the game.

Honours

Toronto FC
Canadian Championship (1): 2010

Individual
Major League Soccer All-Star (1): 2011

References

External links
 

1984 births
Living people
Colorado Rapids players
Toronto FC players
Chivas USA players
Chicago Fire FC players
Christian Brothers Academy (New Jersey) alumni
People from Howell Township, New Jersey
Sportspeople from Monmouth County, New Jersey
Rutgers Scarlet Knights men's soccer players
American people of Italian descent
American soccer players
Expatriate soccer players in Canada
American expatriate sportspeople in Canada
American expatriate soccer players
Soccer players from New Jersey
Major League Soccer players
Major League Soccer All-Stars
Colorado Rapids draft picks
Association football midfielders